Chibidaria is a genus of mites in the family Acaridae.

Species
 Chibidaria tokyoensis Sasa, 1952

References

Acaridae